The individual eventing (Military) was an equestrian event held as part of the equestrian at the 1912 Summer Olympics programme. It was the first appearance of the event.

The competition was held from Saturday to Wednesday, 13 to 17 July 1912 for a period of five days, with a day rest after the first two events. A maximum of four riders from each nation was allowed. The entries closed on 1 June 1912. Every rider had to ride only one and the same horse in the event.

Results 

The start and finish were both on the grounds of the Field Riding Club. In consequence of the hot weather prevailing, the ground was very hard. All the competitors were previously shown the course, which was marked with red flags. In addition to this, a map of the course and definite instructions were given by the guides to the competitors.

Trial 1 – Long distance ride 

Saturday, 13 July: 8 a.m. (Starting interval five minutes) Course of the "Fältridtklubben" (Stockholm Cross Country Riding Club) Riders had 4 hours to cover a distance of 55 kilometres. Jacques Cariou set the fastest time. One rider had a deduction for being 40 seconds too slow and one rider retired.

Trial 2 – Cross country ride 

Saturday, 13 July: The five kilometres course could not be called difficult, the obstacles consisting chiefly of fences, with or without ditches, and streams, however only the heat was oppressive. 15 minutes were allotted. Points were deducted both for going over time (which no rider did) and for faults. Three riders were disqualified due to riding the wrong way. The raw score was 130 points; it was divided by 13 and rounded to two decimal places to get a standardized score for the overall competition.

Trial 3 – Individual riding over steeplechase course 

Monday, 15 July: The third trial was a steeplechase, which took place at Lindarängen. 5 minutes and 50 seconds were allotted. Deductions were taken both for time and for obstacles, though no rider incurred any obstacle faults. Three riders had a deduction for going over time, which causes two points every second. One rider did not start and one rider was disqualified due to riding the wrong way. Bryan Lawrence did not finish the race after falling at a grass-covered ditch outside the course. The accident causing a slight concussion of the brain, from which the rider soon recovered, however. Raw scores were out of 100, divided by 10 to get a standardized score.

Trial 4 – Prize jumping (Show jumping test) 

After the presentation on Monday afternoon of the prizes won in track and field events, the Stadium had been transformed into an obstacle-course, with flower-beds here and there.

Tuesday, 16 July: The fourth trial was an obstacle jumping course, which took place in the Olympiastadion. 15 obstacles, which were of small dimensions and fewer in number than for the other prize jumping events, had to be cleared perfectly. 2 minutes and 45 seconds were allotted. Deductions were taken both for time and for not completely clearing obstacles. One rider did not start and two riders were disqualified. Raw scores were out of 150, which were divided by 15 and rounded to two decimal places to get a standardized score.

The obstacles:

1: Hedge height: 1.10 metre, width: 0.60 metres
2: Fence height: 1.15 metre
3: Stone-Wall height: 1.30 metre, base-width: 1.50 metre, top-width: 0.70 metre
4: Railway-gates two each height: 1.15 metre; 8 metres between
5: Triple-bar height first: 0.75 metre, second: 1.00 metre, third: 1.25 metre; 2 metres between first and last
6: Fence in Dike 2.70 metre from bank to obstacle and also 2.70 metre from obstacle to bank; height: 1.10 metre
7: Hedge and Top Bar height at the front: 0.90 metre and at the back: 1.15 metre width: 0.75 metre
8: Fence-Dike-Hedge height fence: 1.00 metre, height hedge: 0.75 metre; between 5 metres dike, 0.50 metre deep
9: Fence height: 1.35 metre
10: Brick-Wall height: 1.40 metre, base-width: 1.50 metre, top-width: 0.70 metre
11: Country Road with fence on each side, each fence height: 1.00 metre, 9 metres between; behind the first a 1-metre ditch and also in front of the second
12: Earth-Wall with Bar height of the wall: 1.00 metre, with the bar: 1.30 metre; top-width: 0.80 metre
13: Stone-Wall-Dike-Stone-Wall stone wall height: 1.10 metre, base-width: 1.10; 8 metres to the dike, which is 2.50 metre wide, and another stone wall of the same proportions
14: Bank-Fence a 1.30 metre ditch is followed by a long bank with 1.00 height, at the end of the bank a 0.50 metre high fence, followed after 8 metres by a second 1.10 high fence
15: Dike a 0.60 metre high obstacle in front of a 4.00 metres wide dike

Trial 5 – Prize riding (Dressage test) 

Wednesday, 17 July: The prize riding was also held in the Olympiastadion. The score for the final event was determined by a panel of 7 judges, each giving a score of up to 110.  The maximum raw score was therefore 770, which was divided by 77 and rounded to two decimal places to standardize it for the overall competition.

References

Sources
 
 

Equestrian at the 1912 Summer Olympics